Jerrys Plains is a village in the Hunter Region in New South Wales, Australia about 33 kilometres west of Singleton on the Golden Highway. The surrounding countryside is home to some substantial horse-breeding properties, notably the Australian branch of Ireland's giant Coolmore Stud, as well as viticulture and coal mining.

Jerrys Plains Public School opened in January 1881. It had an enrolment of 40 students in 2018.

Jerrys Plains Post Office opened in 1837; it has now closed, though the closure date is unknown. The former post office building later served as a visitor information centre.

St James Anglican Church, designed by John Horbury Hunt, dates from the 1870s. It has monthly services, held on the second Sunday of each month.

The town has a hotel, the Jerrys Plains Tavern, located on Golden Highway. A long-running earlier hotel, the Post Office Hotel, burnt down in December 1947 and was not rebuilt. It initially carried on in temporary premises, but was delicensed in 1953.

Population
In the 2016 Census, there were 385 people in Jerrys Plains. 68.8% of people were born in Australia and 86.5% of people spoke only English at home. The most common responses for religion were Anglican 30.1% and Catholic 27.4%.

References

Suburbs of Singleton Council
Towns in the Hunter Region
Suburbs of Muswellbrook Shire
Hunter River (New South Wales)